Hsieh Ming-yu (born 8 February 1969) is a Taiwanese singer-songwriter.

He was raised in Tainan, and moved to Taipei in 1990, where he wrote several songs for other singers, including Andy Lau, William So, and Anita Mui. He returned to Tainan in 2000 and began composing Hokkien pop songs. He was awarded Best Taiwanese Singer and the Best Taiwanese Album at the 2013 Golden Melody Awards for his album Tainan and was named Best Taiwanese Singer for the second time at the 2017 Golden Melody Awards. Hsieh has often returned to Taipei for performances, and held a concert at SOAS, University of London in 2017.

He taught music and popular culture at Tainan Community College and led the Discover Hoklo in Tainan initiative.

References

1969 births
Living people
People from Nantou County
Musicians from Tainan
Taiwanese Hokkien pop singers
Taiwanese singer-songwriters